Sawmills is a town in Caldwell County, North Carolina, United States. As of the 2010 census, the town population was 5,240. It is part of the Hickory–Lenoir–Morganton Metropolitan Statistical Area. The town is named after the lumber industry which formerly predominated in the area during its early history.

History
The community of Sawmills began in the late 1800s. The name "Sawmills" originates from the sawmills that were set up in the area due to the timber industry. The railroad system that ran through Caldwell County is one of the main reasons for the sawmills to locate in what would become the community of Sawmills. Sawmills was incorporated as a town in 1988. The nearby towns of Granite Falls and Hudson battling for potential business property in the area, is what led the Sawmills community to vote for incorporation, as residents of Sawmills wanted to form a town of their own.

Geography
Sawmills is located in southern Caldwell County, bordered by Hudson to the north and Granite Falls to the east. Rhodhiss Lake borders the town to the south.

Sawmills Veterans Park is located on Rhodhiss Lake, providing trails and recreational facilities such as baseball fields, a soccer field, playground, boat launch area, and an 18-hole disc golf course.

Demographics

2020 census

As of the 2020 United States census, there were 5,020 people, 1,959 households, and 1,417 families residing in the town.

2000 census
As of the census of 2000, there were 4,921 people, 1,942 households, and 1,448 families residing in the town. The population density was 787.4 people per square mile (304.0/km2). There were 2,045 housing units at an average density of 327.2 per square mile (126.3/km2). The racial makeup of the town was 97.34% White, 0.55% African American, 0.20% Native American, 0.16% Asian, 0.02% Pacific Islander, 1.16% from other races, and 0.57% from two or more races. Hispanic or Latino of any race were 2.36% of the population.

There were 1,942 households, out of which 35.7% had children under the age of 18 living with them, 56.8% were married couples living together, 11.5% had a female householder with no husband present, and 25.4% were non-families. 21.0% of all households were made up of individuals, and 5.7% had someone living alone who was 65 years of age or older. The average household size was 2.53 and the average family size was 2.89.

In the town, the population was spread out, with 25.7% under the age of 18, 8.8% from 18 to 24, 32.3% from 25 to 44, 24.0% from 45 to 64, and 9.2% who were 65 years of age or older. The median age was 34 years. For every 100 females, there were 99.0 males. For every 100 females age 18 and over, there were 97.0 males.

The median income for a household in the town was $36,391, and the median income for a family was $41,579. Males had a median income of $27,933 versus $20,688 for females. The per capita income for the town was $15,597. About 4.3% of families and 8.9% of the population were below the poverty line, including 8.2% of those under age 18 and 11.2% of those age 65 or over.

References

External links
Town Website
Sawmills Veterans Park

Towns in Caldwell County, North Carolina
Company towns in North Carolina